Vuk Vulikić (born 7 March 1999) is a Serbian college basketball player for the UTEP Miners of the Conference USA.

Early career 
Vulikić played basketball for youth systems of Mondo Basket, Zemun (2011–2015), and Vizura Shark (2015–16) in his hometown.

College career 
In July 2020, Vulikić committed to play basketball for the UTEP Miners.

Professional career 
In 2016, Vulikić joined Dynamic BG. He left Dynamic BG in July 2020 to play college basketball in the NCAA's Division I.

National team career 
Vulikić was a member of the Serbian U-18 national basketball team that won the gold medal at the 2017 FIBA Europe Under-18 Championship. Over seven tournament games, he averaged 6.0 points, 3.0 rebounds and 4.9 assists per game. Also, he was a member of the Serbian U-16 national basketball team that participated at the 2015 FIBA Europe Under-16 Championship. Vulikić was a member of the Serbian under-20 team that finished 15th at the 2019 FIBA U20 European Championship in Tel Aviv, Israel. Over seven tournament games, he averaged 6.9 points, 2.0 rebounds, and 2.1 assists per game.

References

External links 
 Profile at aba-liga.com
 Player Profile at eurobasket.com
 Player Profile at realgm.com

1999 births
Living people
Basketball players from Belgrade
Basketball League of Serbia players
KK Dynamic players
Serbian expatriate basketball people in the United States
Serbian men's basketball players
Point guards
UTEP Miners men's basketball players